Malin Bridge Old Boys F.C. was an English association football club from Sheffield, South Yorkshire. The club competed in the FA Amateur Cup in 1921 and 1922, and won the Sheffield Amateur League in 1921 and 1925

References

Defunct football clubs in England
Defunct football clubs in South Yorkshire
Sheffield Amateur League